Chernigovsky is a rural locality (a khutor) in Tlyaumbetovsky Selsoviet, Kugarchinsky District, Bashkortostan, Russia. The population was 61 as of 2010. There is 1 street.

Geography 
Chernigovsky is located 41 km west of Mrakovo (the district's administrative centre) by road. Tlyaumbetovo is the nearest rural locality.

References 

Rural localities in Kugarchinsky District